Andrew Ferchland (born January 26, 1987) is an American actor. He began his career as a child actor in 1992.

He has played several minor roles in many films and television series.

Filmography

References

External links

1987 births
20th-century American male actors
21st-century American male actors
American male child actors
American male film actors
American male television actors
Living people
Male actors from Orange County, California